Sinan Akçıl (born 20 May 1982) is a Turkish composer, singer, songwriter and record producer. He is known for producing Hadise's Eurovision 2009 song for Turkey, called "Düm Tek Tek".

Personal life
Sinan Akçıl married popular Turkish actress and model Burcu Kıratlı in Turkish Consulate in Amsterdam, the Netherlands, on 24 December 2018 with a simple marriage ceremony. The couple divorced in September 2019. They married for the second time on 22 February 2021. They divorced again in May 2022.

Criticism
Radio 99 broadcast director Sema Eryiğit: "His songs aired a lot on the radio programs and in different places. But his live performance was disappointing. Maybe he should just continue working as a composer; [that way] he will not have such a fan base anymore, but it would have been more prestigious in the music world."

Atilla Aydoğdu, the music writer of the Akşam newspaper said: "When summer started I wished he would never sing his own songs anymore. Unfortunately, one does not always get what he wants."

Sinan Akçil responded to the criticism in an interview: "'We wish he had remained a musician, composer, ...'; is this even criticism?" "Two people in a hundred say this! Those are probably the people who live on another planet. 98% of them showed so much love and gave beautiful reactions to the album; I did not even hear the criticism. Also, negative criticism should surely exist. I appreciate your feedback and criticism, please keep up reacting!"

Leman Sam also criticized Akçil and said: "While there are beautiful voices like Burak Kut, I do not understand why someone would want to listen to Sinan Akçıl."

Naim Dilmener wrote in his review: "Sinan Akçıl's voice is a disaster. This is a serious bottom point in this country's vocal history. We have not seen anything like this. You know, in those magazine programs, where they would report on the live performances of singers, even Banu Alkan and Seray Sever were not this bad. I wish he would never sing. When it comes to music, he is not a great musician either. He has not created magnificent pieces. But he's still good in that area, he's not bad. But his voice is really bad."

Tolga Akyıldız: "Sinan has no voice, literally no voice. It's a pity. I think he's a good musician though. He comes from a family of musicians. If it were me, I would continue composing and arranging."

Discography

Albums

EPs

Singles

References

Turkish songwriters
1981 births
Living people
Turkish composers
Musicians from Amsterdam
Turkish pop musicians
Turkish record producers
Turkish keyboardists
Dutch people of Turkish descent